Liu Shutian (born December 1940) is a general in the People's Liberation Army of China. He was a member of the 15th and 16th Central Committee of the Chinese Communist Party.

Biography
Liu was born in Teng County (now Tengzhou), Shandong, in December 1940. He enlisted in the People's Liberation Army (PLA) in December 1958 and joined the Chinese Communist Party (CCP) in June 1960. In 1992, he graduated from the PLA Nanjing Political College. In December 1994, he became deputy political commissar of Guangzhou Military Region, rising to political commissar in August 1998. He became political commissar of Chengdu Military Region in December 2003, and served until December 2005. 

He was promoted to the rank of major general (shaojiang) in August 1988, lieutenant general (zhongjiang) in July 1996, and general (shangjiang) in June 2002.

References

1940 births
Living people
People from Tengzhou
PLA Nanjing Political College alumni
People's Liberation Army generals from Shandong
Members of the 15th Central Committee of the Chinese Communist Party
Members of the 16th Central Committee of the Chinese Communist Party